Single Best Answer (SBA or One Best Answer) is a written examination form of multiple choice questions used extensively in medical education.

Structure 

A single question is posed with typically five alternate answers, from which the candidate must choose the best answer. This method avoids the problems of past examinations of a similar form described as Single Correct Answer. The older form can produce confusion where more than one of the possible answers has some validity. The newer form makes it explicit that more than one answer may have elements that are correct, but that one answer will be superior.

Prior to the widespread introduction of SBAs into medical education, the typical form of examination was true-false multiple choice questions. But during the 2000s, educators found that SBAs would be superior.

References 

Medical education